Hate Story is a series of Indian erotic thriller films, produced by Vikram Bhatt and Bhushan Kumar under the banner BVG Films and T-Series. 

The first film was released in 2012 is directed by Vivek Agnihotri, the second film released in 2014 is directed by Vishal Pandya and the third film which is also directed by Vishal Pandya was released on 4 December 2015. fourth film which is once again directed by Vishal Pandya is released on 9 March 2018. Hate Story 3 till date is the most successful film in the franchise.

Cast

Hate Story

Paoli Dam as Kavya Krishnan
Gulshan Devaiah as Siddharth Dhanrajgir 
Nikhil Dwivedi as Vicky 
Joy Sengupta as Rajdev Singh
Mohan Kapoor as Cabinet minister Malhotra
Bhairavi Goswami as Bhairavi
Iravati Harshe as Rajdev's Wife 
Gopal K. Singh as Inspector
Saurabh Dubey as Kumar Dhanrajgir
Mukti Mohan in special appearance in the song 'Raat'

Hate Story 2

 Sushant Singh as Mandar Mhatre 
 Surveen Chawla as Sonika Prasad
 Jay Bhanushali as Akshay Bedi
 Siddharth Kher as Inspector Anton Varghese
 Rajesh Khera as Atul Mhatre
 Neha Kaul as Mandar's Wife
 Sunny Leone in a special appearance in the song 'Pink Lips'

Hate Story 3

 Sharman Joshi as Aditya Deewan
 Zarine Khan as Siya Deewan
 Karan Singh Grover as Saurav Singhania / Karan
 Daisy Shah as Kaya
 Prithvi Zutshi as Vaswani
 Puja Gupta in Special appearance in song "Neendein Khul Jaati Hain"

Hate Story 4

Urvashi Rautela as Natasha Choudhary (Tasha) 
Vivan Bhatena as Aryan Khurana
Karan Wahi as Rajveer Khurana
Ihana Dhillon as Rishma
Gulshan Grover as Vik
Tia Bajpai as Bhavna 
Shaad Randhawa as Ashwin 
James Abbey as Police Officer
Rita Siddiqui as Monica

Hate Story 5 
 
Jimmy Shergill as Viraj Dsouza 
Saif Ali Khan as Amar Dsouza

Crew

Release and revenue

References

External links
 
 
 

2010s Hindi-language films
Indian film series
Indian erotic thriller films
Tetralogies
Thriller film series